Nadjib Mengoud Montes (born 25 May 1996), simply known as Nadjib, is a Spanish footballer, of Algerian origin, who plays for CD Marino as an attacking midfielder.

Club career
Born in Barcelona, Catalonia, Nadjib joined CD Tenerife's youth setup in 2014, after stints at UD Valterra, SCRD Torrelavega and CD Tahíche. He made his debuts as a senior with the former's reserve team in the 2014–15 campaign, in Tercera División.

On 23 August 2015 Nadjib made his first-team debut, coming on as a second-half substitute for Suso Santana in a 3–6 away loss against CD Numancia in the Segunda División. On 31 August 2017, he was loaned to Segunda División B club Real Murcia, for one year.

On 27 July 2018, Nadjib was loaned to CF Badalona in the third division, but the club terminated the loan deal on 6 September.

References

External links

Lanzarote Deportiva profile 

1996 births
Living people
Footballers from Barcelona
Spanish sportspeople of Moroccan descent
Spanish footballers
Association football midfielders
Segunda División players
Segunda División B players
Tercera División players
CD Tenerife B players
CD Tenerife players
Real Murcia players
CF Badalona players
CD Marino players